Eopaussus is an extinct genus of ground beetles in the family Carabidae. This genus has a single species, Eopaussus baltians.

References

Paussinae